is the second of two downloadable content expansion packs in the Pokémon Sword and Shield Expansion Pass for the 2019 role-playing video games Pokémon Sword and Shield on Nintendo Switch. It is developed by Game Freak and published by The Pokémon Company and Nintendo for the Nintendo Switch. It was released on October 22, 2020. It follows The Isle of Armor, which had been released on June 17, 2020. The Pokémon Sword and Shield Expansion Pass physical bundle pack was released on November 6, 2020.

The addition of Expansion Pass was to replace the need for a third version or sequel of Sword and Shield. It is set in the snowy southern area called the Crown Tundra, based on Scotland, in Sword and Shields region of Galar. The player controls the protagonist during their journey through the tundra, home to old legendary Pokémon from past games as well as some new legendary Pokémon.

Gameplay

The location the expansion pack is set is one inter-connected "Wild Area", a free-roaming open world with a free moving camera and dynamic weather, which has implications on which Pokémon species appear at a given time. The defining of The Crown Tundra are the Dynamax Adventures. The player must travel to an area in the tundra called the Max Lair, where they can be given rental Pokémon to battle through three different Max raid battles. After beating a Pokémon, the player can choose which path to choose next. After battling each raid Pokémon, the player must battle a Legendary Pokémon from previous games. The player can choose to catch the Legendary Pokémon, which have a 100% chance of being caught, or they can choose to leave it, losing out on the chance to catch another one if they decide to catch it. These Dynamax Adventures can be played online or single player, and are included as a part of the story. The other big feature for the DLC are Galarian Star Tournaments, which are tournaments where the player and one other character of the player's choice engage in Multi-trainer battles with other characters from Sword & Shield and the expansion pass.

Pokémon
The Crown Tundra centers around the legendary Pokémon Calyrex, resembling a mix of a jackalope, snowy plants and the Crown jewels. Calyrex has a gimmick where it can fuse with two other newly introduced legendary Pokémon named Glastrier and Spectrier, an ice and ghost horse respectively, in order to regain Calyrex's power. The expansion also introduces two legendary Pokémon that resemble the Regi golem trio from Pokémon Ruby and Sapphire, with the electric type Regieleki and the dragon type Regidrago. Adding onto the first expansion pack, a regional form was given to Slowking. However, additional regional forms were given to the legendary bird trio from Pokémon Red and Blue: Articuno, Zapdos and Moltres. Likewise more than a hundred Pokémon are returning from previous generations that didn't appear in the base game, including all the non-mythical legendary Pokémon from previous games (they were seen Dynamaxed in the overall DLC trailer).

Synopsis

The player arrives at the tundra via train from the town of Wedgehurst. Upon arriving, the player encounters two new faces, Pokémon trainer Peony and his daughter Peonia. After the pair have a dispute on where they would like to go, the player battles Peony who is revealed to be a former Steel-type gym leader and Champion before Chairman Rose, his brother, became league head. Peonia uses the battle as cover to escape, and after the battle, Peony chases after her into the Max Lair. The player is forced to follow Peony into the Max Lair and take part in a Dynamax Adventure, in which they cannot use their Pokémon (so that they don't go berserk due to the Galar particles inside the Max Lair). After clearing it, Peonia approaches the player and requests they take her place in her father's "adven-tour". Peony, whilst reluctant, comes to accept the situation. The player and Peony set up their base in the town of Freezington, with Peony appointing the player as the expedition chief who does the exploring while he holds down the fort.

The player must complete four adventures to complete the tour. The first adventure begins with the player learning about the Legendary Pokémon Calyrex. Upon restoring a statue of Calyrex in Freezington, the player ends up encountering Calyrex itself. Calyrex takes over the body of Peony to communicate with the player, telling the player that he's frustrated by being relegated to just a fairy tale by the townspeople. In addition, Calyrex has lost its steed, which is the source of most of its power. The player learns that the steed was in love with a certain type of carrot. The player can choose where to plant the Carrot Seeds they get: they can either grow a Shaderoot Carrot at the Old Cemetery to cause the Ghost-type Spectrier to appear, or an Iceroot Carrot at the Snowslide Slope to cause the Ice-type Glastrier to appear. The steed runs back towards to the town, and forces the player to engage in a battle. Calyrex is forced to intervene when the steed attempts to attack the townsfolk, leaving behind a single strand of hair. With the help of Peony, the player can sew a replica Reins of Unity that Calyrex needs to tame its steed from the strand of the steed's hair and the Radiant Petal received from Calyrex. The player and Calyrex travel to a structure called the Crown Shrine, where Calyrex successfully uses the item to tame its steed again and regain its full power. Calyrex then challenges the player to a battle and lets itself be caught by them.

In the next adventure, the player tracks down and catches the Legendary Pokémon Regirock, Regice, and Registeel at ruins across the tundra. Once all three have been caught, the player can access the Split-Decision Ruins, a fused pair of ruins that house either Regieleki or Regidrago, depending on the pattern they enter in the ruins, and catch it as well. The player can only catch one of the two. Additionally, the player can battle and obtain a Regigigas in a Max raid if they interact with a specific Max raid den with all five other Regi Pokémon in their party. In the third adventure, the player encounters the Galarian Forms of the Legendary birds under a massive tree on Dyna Tree Hill, but the sound of the player's Rotom Phone going off alerts them, and they scatter across the region, becoming roaming Pokémon. Catching all of them and reporting the findings to Peony concludes the adventure.

Near the beginning of the DLC, after the player becomes champion and completes the main post-game story, the player is shown blue-colored tracks on the ground. After interacting with the tracks, Sonia appears. She tells the player that those tracks belong to the Legendary Swords of Justice, Cobalion, Terrakion and Virizion, who first appeared in Pokémon Black and White. She asks the player to find the rest of the tracks, in a side-quest of sorts. After the player finds 100% of a track, they can speak to Sonia in one of the houses in Freezington to be given the location of the corresponding Sword of Justice, where they can be found roaming the overworld. With Cobalion, Terrakion and Virizion in their party, the player can find Keldeo on a small island on Ballimere Lake after interacting with unidentified tracks and cooking curry. After the player has concluded all three adventures, Peonia reunites with her father at the base, eager to go on another adventure. Peony, without any more legends to take his daughter on, tries to tell his daughter that he'll come up with some new legends. This upsets her, causing her to go back to the Max Lair, followed by Peony, concluding the main story.

However, the player then finds an adventure description about Ultra Wormholes that Peony doesn't even recall writing. Showing it to him will make finding and catching Necrozma at the Max Lair the next quest. Once Necrozma has been caught, the scientist running the Max Lair reveals herself to be the writer of the adventure description. After the fourth adventure has started, Leon, the former champion of Galar, will contact the player informing them of the new Galarian Star Tournament, which they can participate in at Wyndon Stadium. In this Multi Battle tournament, the player teams up with either Hop or Marnie and eventually goes on to face and defeat Leon and Raihan or Piers and Raihan, respectively, in the finals. Afterward, Leon declares the Galarian Star Tournament as a permanent new feature of Wyndon Stadium.

Development
The expansion pass was first announced in the January 9, 2020 Pokémon Direct and again shown briefly in the March 26 Nintendo Direct Mini. Following this, the pass was shown off in great detail in the June 17 Pokémon Presents, hours before The Isle of Armor was released worldwide. A follow-up on information was released on September 29, during a DLC livestream presentation. At the end of the last presentation before the release of the DLC was a music video for Acacia, the newest song from Japanese alternative rock band Bump of Chicken, which acted as both a celebration of The Crown Tundra as well as the franchise in general.

Reception

The DLC received generally positive reviews. On Metacritic it has a score of 75 out of 100 based on reviews from 23 critics.

Notes

See also
 Pokémon Sword and Shield: The Isle of Armor
Pokémon Sword and Shield

References

External links 
 

Video game expansion packs
Video game downloadable content